Aleksandr Vasilyevich Grantovskiy (born 15 March 1978) is a former Russian professional football player.

Club career
He played in the Russian Football National League for FC Volgar-Gazprom Astrakhan in 2005.

References

External links
 

1978 births
Sportspeople from Krasnodar
Living people
Russian footballers
Association football midfielders
FC Chernomorets Novorossiysk players
FC Olimpia Volgograd players
FC SKA Rostov-on-Don players
FC Volgar Astrakhan players
FC Zvezda Irkutsk players
FC Zhemchuzhina Sochi players